3-deoxy-D-manno-octulosonic acid kinase (kdkA (gene), Kdo kinase) is an enzyme with systematic name ATP:(KDO)-lipid IVA 3-deoxy-alpha-D-manno-oct-2-ulopyranose 4-phosphotransferase. This enzyme catalyses the following chemical reaction

 alpha-Kdo-(2->6)-lipid IVA + ATP  4-O-phospho-alpha-Kdo-(2->6)-lipid IVA + ADP

The enzyme phosphorylates the 4-OH position of KDO in (KDO)-lipid IVA.

References

External links 
 

EC 2.7.1